The 1916 American Cup was the annual open cup held by the American Football Association. The 1916 edition included 37 of the top eastern teams. The title was won by Bethlehem Steel with a 3-0 win over the Scottish Americans courtesy of a hat trick by Neil Clarke making Bethlehem the first team to win the American and National cups in the same season.

American Cup Bracket

Final

See also
1916 National Challenge Cup

Amer
American Cup